Erchie is a comune in the province of Brindisi in Apulia, on the south-east Italy coast. Its main economic activities are tourism and the growing of olives and grapes.

People
 Alfredo Nigro, (1975) opera singer
 Mauro Lacandia, (1990) singer (Tarantola)
 Sergio Contessa, (1990) football player (Lecce, Padova)

References

External links

Official website

Cities and towns in Apulia
Localities of Salento